Kristina Šundov (born 17 September 1986) is a Croatian football striker currently playing for FC Basel of the Swiss Nationalliga A. Previously, she played for Bayer 04 Leverkusen and MSV Duisburg in the German Bundesliga, Telstar in the BeNe League and in the Swiss Nationalliga A for FFC Zuchwil 05 (with which she played the European Cup), FC Thun and FC Basel. She is a member of the Croatian national team; she made her debut in May 2003 against Slovenia.

International goals

References

External links
 

1986 births
Living people
MSV Duisburg (women) players
Bayer 04 Leverkusen (women) players
Telstar (women's football club) players
Croatian women's footballers
Croatia women's international footballers
Expatriate women's footballers in Germany
Expatriate women's footballers in Switzerland
Expatriate women's footballers in the Netherlands
Eredivisie (women) players
Footballers from Split, Croatia
Frauen-Bundesliga players
Women's association football forwards
FC Basel Frauen players
Swiss Women's Super League players
FFC Zuchwil 05 players
Croatian expatriate sportspeople in Germany
Croatian expatriate sportspeople in Switzerland
Croatian expatriate sportspeople in the Netherlands
Croatian expatriate women's footballers